Isaac Newton Wigney (1795 – 8 February 1844) was an English  banker and Liberal Party politician who sat in the House of Commons between 1832 and 1842.

Wigney was the son of William Wigney and his wife Ann Killick. His father was a successful banker in Brighton. In about 1821 Isaac Newton Wigney married Caroline Walter, daughter of William Walter, eldest son of John Walter founder and editor of the Times Newspaper. Niece of (second)|John Walter]], former editor of The Times and later MP for Berkshire.

At the 1832 general election Wigney was elected as a Member of Parliament (MP) for Brighton. He held the seat until his defeat in 1837, but was re elected at the 1841 general election.

In 1836 Wigney took over the bank on the death of his father. However, in 1842 the  bank failed. Wigney was declared bankrupt, left Brighton and gave up his seat in the House of Commons. He died two years later at the age of 49.

References

External links

1795 births
1844 deaths
English bankers
UK MPs 1832–1835
UK MPs 1835–1837
UK MPs 1837–1841
UK MPs 1841–1847
Liberal Party (UK) MPs for English constituencies
19th-century English businesspeople